Oxycilla mitographa, the oxycilla cane moth, is a species of moth in the family Erebidae. The species was first described by Augustus Radcliffe Grote in 1873. It is found in North America.

The MONA or Hodges number for Oxycilla mitographa is 8408.

References

Further reading

 
 
 

Rivulinae
Articles created by Qbugbot
Moths described in 1873